Campinense Clube, commonly referred to as Campinense, is a Brazilian professional club based in Campina Grande, Paraíba founded on 12 April 1915. It competes in the Campeonato Brasileiro Série D, the fourth tier of Brazilian football, as well as in the Campeonato Paraibano, the top flight of the Paraíba state football league.

Campinense is currently ranked third among Paraíba teams in CBF's national club ranking, at 72nd place overall.

History
The club was founded on April 12, 1915 as a dancing club by Elias Montenegro, Dino Belo, Antônio Lima and several others. The club's headquarters were located at Colégio Campinense. José Câmara was Campinense's first president.

In 1960, Campinense won its first state championship., which was the first of six consecutive championships won by the club. In 1961, the club competed in the Taça Brasil, finishing as the Northeastern Group runner-up after being defeated in the final by Bahia. In 1972, the club was defeated by Sampaio Corrêa in the Campeonato Brasileiro Série B final, finishing as the championship's runner-up. In 1975, Campinense competed in the Campeonato Brasileiro Série A for the first time, finishing in the competition's last position. The club competed again in that competition in 1978, 1979, and in 1981.

Symbols
The club's mascot is a fox wearing a top hat.

Stadium

Campinense's home stadium is Estádio Governador Ernani Sátiro, usually known as Amigão, inaugurated in 1975, with a maximum capacity of 40,000 people.

Rivalries
The club has a fierce rivalry with city rivals Treze Futebol Clube.

Honours
 Copa do Nordeste
 Winners (1): 2013

 Campeonato Paraibano
 Winners (22): 1960, 1961, 1962, 1963, 1964, 1965, 1967, 1971, 1972, 1973, 1974, 1979, 1980, 1991, 1993, 2004, 2008, 2012, 2015, 2016, 2021, 2022

References

External links
 Campinense Clube's official website

Campinense Clube
Association football clubs established in 1915
Football clubs in Paraíba
1915 establishments in Brazil